Tatiana Sergeyevna Mouratova (born September 19, 1979 in Moscow) is a three-time Olympic modern pentathlete from Russia. She is also a multiple-time medalist at the World Championships, and a double champion at the Open National Championships in her home city, Moscow.

Mouratova achieved her best results, and consistently performed in the women's event at the Olympics, finishing thirteenth in 2000, twenty-seventh in 2004, and thirteenth in 2008.

References

External links
 

1979 births
Living people
Russian female modern pentathletes
Olympic modern pentathletes of Russia
Modern pentathletes at the 2000 Summer Olympics
Modern pentathletes at the 2004 Summer Olympics
Modern pentathletes at the 2008 Summer Olympics
Sportspeople from Moscow
World Modern Pentathlon Championships medalists
21st-century Russian women